Arihara is a Japanese surname. Notable people with the surname include:

, Japanese pop singer and former member of Cute
, Japanese professional baseball player

Japanese-language surnames